Manitoba has 81 communities, excluding rural municipalities, that have a population of 1,000 or greater according to the 2021 Census of Canada conducted by Statistics Canada. These communities include cities, towns, villages, reserves inhabited by First Nations, a local government district that is urban in nature, designated places, and population centres. A population centre, according to Statistics Canada, is an area with a population of at least 1,000 and a density of 400 or more people per square kilometre.

List

See also 
List of census agglomerations in Manitoba
List of communities in Manitoba
List of municipalities in Manitoba
List of population centres in Manitoba
Manitoba Geography

References 

Communities